A Silkie is a breed of domestic chicken.

Silkie or Silky also may refer to:
 Silkie, guinea pig of one specific variety
 Silkie, a fictional character in Teen Titans animation series on television
 Silkie, a mythical species, a.k.a. Selkie, that passes for both seal and human
Silkies, a type of house-dwelling spirits clothed in silk
 Silkies, a superhuman race in The Silkie, a science fiction novel by A. E. van Vogt
 Silky, a character from the anime series I'm Gonna Be An Angel! (Tenshi ni Narumon)
 Silky Nutmeg Ganache, American drag queen
 The Silkie, English folk group
 Silkie, English dubstep producer
 "Silkie", a song from the album Joan Baez, Vol. 2
The Silkie (novel), a 1969 novel by A. E. Van Vogt

See also
 Australian Silky Terrier, known in North America as a Silky Terrier
Selkie (disambiguation)